h2o Wireless is a United States-based prepaid GSM phone and mobile Internet service, utilizing the AT&T GSM 4G LTE network.  It is a brand of mobile virtual network operator (MVNO) Locus Telecommunications, a subsidiary of Telrite Holdings, Inc. since 2019.  Locus was formerly a subsidiary of KDDI America Corporation, starting in 2010.  h2o Wireless is primarily advertised as a non-restrictive phone service for customers to bring or buy unsubsidised / unlocked smartphones, although AT&T contract / locked phones may be accepted as well.

Service Plan
Wireless offers both monthly and pay-as-you-go plans. The Monthly Plans start with the 20 plan, which has 8GB of 3G E data and provides 365 days of service.

Authorized Dealers 
Due to only having one office, h2o Wireless sources its services to dealers who work as independent contractors under their own company name. Such sellers are known as “Authorized Dealers”.

References

External links
 H2O Wireless website

Mobile virtual network operators
Telecommunications companies established in 2005
Companies based in Bergen County, New Jersey
Mobile phone companies of the United States